was a Japanese politician who served as governor of Saitama Prefecture (1897–1898), Aomori Prefecture(1899–1901), Fukui Prefecture (1901–1902), Miyagi Prefecture (1902–1903), Kōchi Prefecture (1903–1907), Hiroshima Prefecture from 1907 to 1912 and Kumamoto Prefecture in 1912.

Governors of Hiroshima
1854 births
1918 deaths
Japanese Home Ministry government officials
Governors of Saitama Prefecture
Governors of Aomori Prefecture
Governors of Fukui Prefecture
Governors of Miyagi Prefecture
Governors of Kochi Prefecture
Governors of Kumamoto Prefecture